Platyplectrum melanopyga, the Wokan cannibal frog, is a species of frog in the family Limnodynastidae.
It is found in New Guinea.

It was classified in the former genus Lechriodus until its synonymization with Platyplectrum in 2021.

As one of the most common amphibians of New Guinea, its natural habitats are subtropical or tropical dry forests, subtropical or tropical moist lowland forests, freshwater marshes, intermittent freshwater marshes, and plantations.

References

Platyplectrum
Amphibians of New Guinea
Amphibians described in 1875
Taxa named by Giacomo Doria
Taxonomy articles created by Polbot